Punjab Communist Revolutionary Committee, originally the Bhatinda District Committee of AICCCR. The committee was one of the sections that broke away when AICCCR founded CPI(M-L). In June 1976 PCRC merged with UCCRI(ML).

See also
Wahikar Union

Defunct political parties in Punjab, India
Defunct communist parties in India
Political parties disestablished in 1976
Political parties with year of establishment missing